opened in Mikasa, Hokkaidō, Japan in 1979. The collection documents the natural history and history of the area and is renowned for its ammonites as well as for the Yezo Mikasa Ryū type fossil, discovered in 1976 and designated a Natural Monument.

See also
 Ishikari coalfield
 List of Natural Monuments of Japan (Hokkaidō)
 Pokémon Fossil Museum — a travelling exhibition hosted by the Mikasa City Museum from 4 July to 20 September 2021

References

External links
  Mikasa City Museum
  Mikasa City Museum

Mikasa, Hokkaido
Museums in Hokkaido
City museums in Japan
Museums established in 1979
1979 establishments in Japan